The 2009 World Table Tennis Championships women's doubles was the 49th edition of the women's doubles championship.
Li Xiaoxia and Guo Yue defeated Ding Ning and Guo Yan in the final by four sets to one.

Seeds

  Guo Yue /  Li Xiaoxia (champions)
  Ding Ning /  Guo Yan (final)
  Jiang Huajun /  Tie Ya Na (semifinals)
  Kim Kyung-ah /  Park Mi-young (semifinals)
  Feng Tianwei /  Wang Yuegu (quarterfinals)
  Cao Zhen /  Liu Shiwen (quarterfinals)
  Ai Fukuhara /  Sayaka Hirano (quarterfinals)
  Sun Beibei /  Yu Mengyu (third round)
  Georgina Póta /  Krisztina Tóth (third round)
  Dang Ye-seo /  Lee Eun-hee (third round)
  Li Jiao /  Li Jie (first round)
  Elke Schall /  Wu Jiaduo (third round)
  Lin Ling /  Zhang Rui (quarterfinals)
  Nikoleta Stefanova /  Wenling Tan Monfardini (second round)
  Daniela Dodean /  Elizabeta Samara (second round)
  Li Qiangbing /  Liu Jia (third round)

Final Rounds

Early rounds

Section 1

Section 2

Section 3

Section 4

See also
List of World Table Tennis Championships medalists

References

- Women's doubles, 2009 World Table Tennis Championships
World